Holland House, Kingsgate, in Kent, is a Georgian country house built  between 1762 and 1768 as his retirement home by the politician Henry Fox, 1st Baron Holland (1705-1774), of Holland House in Kensington. It is a Grade II listed building.

The house is situated in a dip between two clifftops. It overlooks the sea at Kingsgate Bay, to the beach of which it had access through a stone arched gate originally named Bartholomew Gate (or Bart'lem Gate). The gate was later renamed King's Gate, as it was reputedly where King Charles II landed in 1683, during a storm, while on his way to Dover. On the change of its name by the King's command, the following Latin distich was composed by a Mr. Toddy of Josse, then proprietor of the land on which the gate stood; it was inscribed on a stone tablet on the gate's land-side:
Olim Porta fui Patroni Bartholomaei, 
Nunc Regis Jussu Regia porta vocor. 
Hic exscenderunt Car. II. R. 
Et Ja. dux Ebor, 30 Junii, 1683. 
Translated:
I once by St. Bartholomew was claim'd, 
But now, so bids the King, am Kingsgate nam'd. 
King Charles II. and James, Duke of York, landed here, 
                  June 30, 1683.

Henry Fox
Holland House was built by Henry Fox, 1st Baron Holland (1705-1774), of Holland House in Kensington, to the designs of the amateur architect Thomas Wynn, 1st Baron Newborough (1736–1807) (created Baron Newborough in 1766). It was said to have been inspired by Cicero's villa at Formiae on the coast of Baiae. Lord Holland commissioned the architect Robert Adam to design the interiors, but the work was not completed. A single 1767 design by Adam, for the ceiling of Lady Holland's bedroom, survives in the collection of  Sir John Soane's Museum. Lord Holland added several follies around the house, including a stable block known as Kingsgate Castle, and another building now known as the Captain Digby Public House.

The estate was used by Lord Holland and his family for the shooting of partridges and the playing of cricket. In 1767 Lord Holland purchased the nearby estate of Quex, in the parish of Birchington, from Catherine, Countess of Guildford, one of the three daughters and coheirs of Sir Robert Furnese, Baronet. Holland House, Kingsgate was inherited by Lord Holland's second surviving son, the Whig statesman and notorious gambler Charles James Fox (1749-1806), who sold the estate, together with Quex, to John Powell (d.1783). The estates on the Isle of Thanet owned by Charles James Fox were: Kingsgate estate (153 acres) in St. Peter, Quex Mansion estate (276 a.) and Quex farm (324 a.) in Birchington and Woodchurch, Dandelion Farm (396 a.) in St. John and Woodchurch, Hain Farm (178 a.) in St. Laurence, Fleet Farm (103 a.), malthouse and land (28a.) near Fort Green, Margate. By the end of the eighteenth century, Holland House had become dilapidated.

Roberts (Powell)

In 1804 and 1812 Holland House was the seat of John Powell Roberts (1769-1849), who in 1814, having become the heir of his elder brother Arthur Annesley Powell (d.1813), adopted the surname and arms of Powell, by Act of Parliament. The uncle of both brothers, John Powell (d.1783) of Kingsgate and nearby Quex House (or Quekes) in Birchington, died without progeny and bequeathed his estates to his eldest nephew on condition that he and future heirs adopted the surname and arms of Powell. Arthur Annesley Powell killed Charles John Cary, 9th Viscount Falkland (1768–1809) in a duel in 1809, and is memorialised by Falkland's friend Lord Byron in his poem "English Bards and Scotch Reviewers":
If mad with loss existence ‘gins to tire,
And all your hope or wish is to expire,
Here’s Powell’s pistol ready for your life
And kinder still a Paget for your wife.

Shortly before 1809, John Powell Roberts rebuilt Quex House in its present form, and in 1814 built at Quex a 50-foot round tower as an observation point and for signalling. He was a yachtsman, cannon collector, and a keen bell-ringer. In 1820 he became a member of the recently founded Royal Yacht Club at Cowes in the Isle of Wight, and was the owner of the 'Briton', a 95-ton schooner.

In 1807, Edward Gyfford (1773-1856) developed a plan to convert the estate into a seaside resort, but the scheme was never effected.

Lubbock
The estate was subsequently acquired by the banker and archaeologist John Lubbock, 1st Baron Avebury (1834-1913), who enlarged Kingsgate Castle as his residence. Holland House's surviving façade dates from a remodelling circa 1850-40. The original central portico was removed to the Sea Bathing Hospital at Margate.

Lawrence
Holland House later became the home of Charles Lawrence, 1st Baron Lawrence of Kingsgate (1855-1927), who in 1923 was elevated to the peerage as Baron Lawrence of Kingsgate, of Holland House, Kingsgate, in the County of Kent.

It was later divided into three residences. It was subdivided into flats in the 1990s, although without its classical colonnaded portico, the central part being known as "Old Holland House".

Follies
Follies built in the environs of Holland House by Lord Holland included:
Kingsgate Castle, originally intended as stables.
Arx Ruochim, a coastal fort above White Ness, built in the style of several erected by King Henry VIII. It is said to have replaced a fort built on the site by King Vortigern in 458 AD. It survives, but missing its tower.
The King's Gate, a mock defensive Gothic crenellated gateway with portcullis, built on the beach in a gap between the cliffs, leading up to Holland House. Originally named Barthelmas Gate, it was renamed to commemorate a forced landing there in 1683 by King Charles II during a storm.
Hackendown Tower, built by Lord Holland on a Saxon burial mound which he had excavated in 1765, which he supposed marked the site of a battle between the Anglo-Saxons and the Danes. The name is apparently a play on "hack 'em down".
Countess Fort, possibly used as an icehouse.
Captain Digby, now a public house. Named after Lord Holland’s nephew, Admiral  Robert Digby (1732-1815), after whom is named the town of Digby in Nova Scotia.
Whitfield Tower, built by Lord Holland on the highest point in the locality, in memory of Robert Whitfield, from whom he purchased much of the estate.

References

Country houses in Kent